The A22 is one of the two-digit major roads in the south east of England.  Radial, it carries traffic from London to the Eastbourne area of the East Sussex coast, in which town it ends.

History

Turnpikes
For part of its route the A22 utilises the turnpikes opened in the 18th century:
 1718: London to East Grinstead section opened as a turnpike
 1720: above road extended through East Grinstead to Highgate, Forest Row, the entrance to Ashdown Forest
By 1820 the road ran for 34 miles (54 km) from Stones End Street, Borough, London to Wych Cross.

Extension to Westminster Bridge
The road was extended north to Westminster Bridge which was later renamed the A23.

Route
The A22 diverges from the A23 south of London at Purley Cross Junction (south of Purley). It runs over the North Downs into Surrey, crossing the M25 London Orbital Motorway just north of Godstone. This section incorporates the Caterham bypass, which opened in 1939 as one of the earliest such roads in the country, including the Wapses Lodge roundabout at the northern end. It then travels along the route of an ancient Roman road.

To the south of the M25, the road briefly enters West Sussex at Felbridge, just to the north of East Grinstead, and the A264 between Crawley and Tunbridge Wells merges with the A22 for a short section. The A22 bypasses East Grinstead town centre, running along a disused railway cutting, part of a line which closed as a consequence of the Beeching Report, which cut large numbers of local rail services. Richard Beeching was a local resident, and as a result, some local residents wanted to call this section the "Beeching Cut". Instead, it was named Beeching Way.

To the south of East Grinstead the A22 crosses into East Sussex, just north of Forest Row. Between Forest Row and Nutley the road crosses the ancient Ashdown Forest. The A22 is the only road through the forest not subject to 40 mph speed limits. The A275 branches south to Lewes at the Wych Cross junction. Both the A272 and the A26 cross the A22 between Nutley and Uckfield. The A26 merges with the A22 for the section round Uckfield. There are bypasses of East Hoathly and Hailsham. There is a junction with the A27, to the north of the end of the A22, in Eastbourne.

Gallery

See also
Great Britain road numbering scheme

References

Streets in the London Borough of Croydon
Roads in London
Roads in Surrey
Roads in East Sussex
Roads in West Sussex
Ashdown Forest